This is a list of the heads of state of Barbados, from the independence of Barbados under the Barbados Independence Act 1966 to the present day.

From 30 November 1966 until 30 November 2021, the head of state was the Queen of Barbados, Elizabeth II, who was also the Monarch of the United Kingdom and the other Commonwealth realms, represented in Barbados by a Governor-General.

Since 30 November 2021, the head of state is the President of Barbados.

Monarch (1966–2021)
The succession to the Barbadian throne was the same as the succession to the British throne.

Governor-General
Under the Constitution of Barbados, before its amendment in 2021, the governor-general was the representative of the monarch in Barbados and exercised most of the powers of the monarch. The governor-general was appointed for an indefinite term, serving at the pleasure of the monarch. Since Barbados was granted independence by the Barbados Independence Act 1966, rather than being first established as a semi-autonomous Dominion and later promoted to independence by the Statute of Westminster 1931, the governor-general had always been appointed solely on the advice of the Cabinet of Barbados, without the involvement of the British government, with the sole exception of John Montague Stow, the last colonial governor, who served as governor-general temporarily until he was replaced by Sir Arleigh Winston Scott. In the event of a vacancy the chief justice served as administrator of the government.

Status

President (2021–present)
Under the Constitution of Barbados, as amended in 2021, the position of president of Barbados replaced the monarch as head of state. The position of president is elected by parliament for a four-year term. In the event of a vacancy, or for any reason the president is unable to perform the functions conferred upon them by the constitution, those functions are performed by an acting president appointed by the prime minister, after consultation with the leader of the opposition. However, while the president is suspended from office in case of ongoing impeachment proceedings, the president of the Senate of Barbados serves as acting president. The presidential line of succession is not defined beyond that.

Standards

Timeline

References

 World Statesmen – Barbados
 Rulers.org – Barbados

 

Government of Barbados
Monarchy of Barbados
H
B
Heads of state
Barbados